Metal Mayhem (formerly Metal Mania or Headbangers) is a block of classic heavy metal/hard rock music videos that first aired on VH1 Classic. The series originally featured music videos from 1970s to early 1990s, but since VH1 Classic's transition to MTV Classic, it has now incorporated music videos from the 1980s to mid-1990s and some videos from the 1970s. The block now airs every Friday between 8pm and midnight Central Time. In addition, Metal Mania was briefly changed to Headbangers before reverting to its original until it was changed to Metal Mayhem.

VH1 Classic: Metal Mania - Stripped

Track listing

VH1 Classic: Metal Mania - Stripped, Vol. 2: The Anthems

Track listing

Metal Mania: Stripped Across America Live!

VH1 Classic: Metal Mania - Stripped, Vol. 3

Track listing

External links
 
 

American music television series
Heavy metal television series
VH1 music shows